Ganzi Mugula (born 24 July 1979) is an Olympic swimmer from Uganda. He has swum for Uganda at the:
Olympics: 2012
World Championships: 2003, 2009,2011
Commonwealth Games: 2010
Short Course Worlds: 2012

At the 2012 Olympics, he served as Uganda's flagbearer.

References

1979 births
Living people
Swimmers at the 2010 Commonwealth Games
Commonwealth Games competitors for Uganda
Swimmers at the 2012 Summer Olympics
Olympic swimmers of Uganda
Ugandan male swimmers
20th-century Ugandan people
21st-century Ugandan people